110 Medium Regiment is part of the Regiment of Artillery of the Indian Army.

Formation and history
The regiment was raised at Allahabad on 1 January 1981 with 130 mm guns. The first commanding officer was Lieutenant Colonel (later Colonel) APS Grewal. The regiment was initially attached to an infantry division in Central India, following which it has served as part of an infantry division, an independent artillery brigade, an armoured division and a mountain division. The regiment has also taken part in counter-insurgency duties at different locations.

Equipment 
The regiment has had the following guns in chronological order -
M-46 130 mm Field Gun 
5.5-inch medium gun
155 mm Haubits FH77/B Howitzer

Operations
The regiment has taken part in the following operations –
Operation Rakshak II (counter terrorism operations)
Operation Rhino (counter terrorism operations in Assam)
Operation Vijay
Operation Parakram 
Operation Rakshak (counter terrorism operations)

Gallantry awards
The regiment has won the following gallantry awards – 
Sena Medal – Major Jasprit Singh Gujral, Captain Amitabh Singh, Naik Bijoy Chutia (Operation Rhino)
Chief of Army Staff Commendation cards – Subedar Raj Kumar, Naik Sarveshwar Rai (Operation Rhino), Subedar Jay Prakash Tiwari
Vice Chief of Army Staff Commendation Card – Naik Anil Kumar
General Officer in Command Commendation card – Subedar Baksheesh Singh (Operation Rakshak II)

War cry
The war cry of the unit is झण्डा ऊँचा रहे हमारा (Jhanda Ooncha Rahe Hamara), which translates to Keep Our Flag High.

See also
List of artillery regiments of Indian Army

References

Military units and formations established in 1981
Artillery regiments of the Indian Army after 1947